Rokkor was a brand name used for all Chiyoda Kōgaku Seikō and later Minolta lenses between 1940 and 1980, including a few, which were marketed and sold by other companies like Leica. The name was derived from the name of Rokkō (六甲山), a 932 metre (3058') high mountain, which could be seen from the company's glass-making and optics factory at Mukogawa near Osaka, Japan. The company's founder  wanted the name to symbolize the high quality in optics.

Overview
The first lens to carry the Rokkor designation was a 200mm 4.5 lens that came with the hand-holdable aerial camera Chiyoda SK-100 in 1940. After the Rokkor name was dropped and no longer engraved in new lenses after 1980/1981, the Rokkor name resurfaced two times. As was revealed not before 2006, the Rokkor name was still used internally for prototypes of a never released SR-mount Minolta MD Apo Tele Rokkor 300mm 2.8 manual-focus lens in the early 1980s, a lens design, which later saw life as the A-mount Minolta AF Apo Tele 300mm 2.8 G in 1985, a non-Rokkor auto-focus lens. The Rokkor name was also resurrected for a short time between 1996 and 1998 for the Minolta G-Rokkor 28mm 3.5 lens. As the only officially released auto-focus Rokkor ever, this lens was incorporated into the Minolta TC-1 135 film compact camera. To celebrate Minolta's 70th anniversary in 1998, the same optics were also used in the Minolta TC-1 Limited as well as in a Leica thread-mount version of the lens in a limited production run of 2000 units for the Japanese market only.

When the brand was still used by Minolta, there were also printed Minolta magazines named "ROKKOR" in Austria and Japan.

The brand was so well respected among photographers that some customers asked for "Rokkor cameras" and questioned the origin of the lenses when the first Minolta lenses without the Rokkor designation hit the market between 1977 and 1980. Many continued to call at least the manual-focus Minolta SR-mount lenses "Rokkors" long after the name was dropped. Even decades later, when Sony took over the A-mount auto-focus SLR system from Konica Minolta in 2006, for which no Rokkor lenses were ever produced, there were (unsuccessful) petitions to reintroduce the old Rokkor brand. There are now even totally unrelated pseudo-brands named Rokunar and Rokinon trying to capitalize on the power of Minolta's brand.  

For some while in the 1960s and 1970s SR-mount SLR lenses manufactured for the North American market were engraved with Rokkor-X rather than just Rokkor (as was used in the rest of the world) in order to improve trackability and dry out the gray market. Although some buyers from the USA and Europe each associated either the Rokkor-X or the non-X-ed Rokkor designation with a higher quality, respectively, both types of lenses were built to exactly the same specifications and quality standards in the factory. They differed only in their name plate. In the 1980s and 1990s, Minolta used a similar scheme for A-mount lenses, which were labelled Maxxum AF in the USA and Canada (where the A-mount camera bodies were labelled Maxxum) and just AF elsewhere (including in those regions otherwise using the Dynax and α labels for the cameras).

Until around 1975, the Rokkor (or Rokkor-X) name was followed by a two-letter combination indicating the optical formula of the lens. The first letter stood for the number of groups (T=3, Q=4, P=5, H=6, S=7, O=8, N=9), while the second letter indicated the number of elements (C=3, D=4, E=5, F=6, G=7, H=8, I=9, J=10, K=11, L=12), f.e. a Rokkor-QF was a six element lens with four groups.

Specialist types of Rokkor lenses 

E.Rokkor - lenses for enlargers with Leica thread-mount
C.E.Rokkor/C.E.Rokkor-X - lenses for color enlargers with Leica thread-mount
F.Rokkor - for fax machines or copiers?
R.Rokkor - for microfiche / repro systems?
W.Rokkor/W.Rokkor-X - Wide-angle lenses with SR-mount
UW.Rokkor - Ultra-wide angle lenses with SR-mount
P-Rokkor - slide projection lenses
G-Rokkor - a combination of Minolta's "G" (gold) designation for high-end lenses and the Rokkor brand, the only lens to carry this designation is the Minolta G-Rokkor 28mm 3.5 in the TC-1 as well as with Leica thread-mount
M-Rokkor - lenses for the Minolta/Leica M-mount

Super Rokkor,
Boen Rokkor,
Fish-Eye Rokkor,
VFC Rokkor,
Shift CA Rokkor,
Varisoft Rokkor,
Bellows Micro Rokkor,
Micro Rokkor,
Bellows Macro Rokkor,
Macro Rokkor,
Tele Rokkor,
RF Rokkor,
Zoom Rokkor,
Rokkor-TC,
Rokkor-TD,
TV Zoom Rokkor.

See also 
Nikkor
Fujinon
Takumar
Zuiko
Yashinon
Yashikor

References

External links
 Lens specifications – The Minolta User Group (MUG)
 Rokkor Digital

Minolta lenses
Photographic lenses by brand
Japanese brands